The Punta Moscarter Lighthouse is an active lighthouse, near Portinatx on the northern coast of the Spanish island of Ibiza.

Work began on the lighthouse in 1975 and it became operational in November 1978. The  concrete tower then became the tallest in the Balearic Islands, superseding the Illa de l'Aire Lighthouse on Menorca which has a masonry tower of 38 m.

See also 

 List of lighthouses in Spain
 List of lighthouses in the Balearic Islands

References

External links 

 Comisión de faros
 Balearic Lighthouses

Lighthouses in the Balearic Islands
Buildings and structures in Mallorca
Lighthouses completed in 1977